Pisco punch was an alcoholic beverage made famous by Duncan Nicol at the Bank Exchange Saloon at the end of the 19th century, in San Francisco, California. The Bank Exchange Saloon was located on the southeast corner of the intersection of Montgomery and Washington Streets, in the Montgomery Block building, where the Transamerica Pyramid now stands.

History of Pisco
Pisco is a late 16th-century brandy made from grapes that are originally from Peru. It was available in San Francisco since the 1830s when it was  first brought from Paita, Peru via ship by rawhide and tallow traders trading with California towns. During the California Gold Rush of 1849, brandy was readily available in San Francisco.

There are eight approved grape varietals, four considered to be non-aromatic:  Quebranta, Negra Criolla, Uvina, and Mollar, while the aromatics are  Moscatel, Torontel, Italia, and Albilla. They grow in one of five growing regions in 42 different valleys. Pisco was the first distilled spirit made in the new world. As there were no glass bottles in the 16th century, the brandy was shipped in ceramic (clay) containers sealed with beeswax.

"In 1839, early in the year, the brig, Daniel O'Connell, an English vessel, arrived at Yerba Buena from Payta [sic], Peru, with a cargo of Peruvian and other foreign goods, having on board a considerable quantity of pisco or Italia, a fine delicate liquor manufactured at a place called Pisco.

History of the drink
When the Bank Exchange & Billiard Saloon opened its doors in 1853 it served pisco among other several liquors. Several punches were made using pisco at the Bank Exchange over a long succession of owners, ending in 1893 with Duncan Nicol. Nicol was the last owner of the Bank Exchange when it closed its doors permanently in 1919 because of the Volstead Act.

Duncan Nicol invented the pisco punch recipe using pisco brandy, pineapple, lime juice, sugar, gum arabic and distilled water. The punch was so potent that one writer of the day wrote "it tastes like lemonade but comes back with the kick of a roped steer." Others said, "it makes a gnat fight an elephant." Harold Ross, founder of The New Yorker magazine wrote in 1937: "In the old days in San Francisco there was a famous drink called Pisco Punch, made from Pisco, a Peruvian brandy... pisco punch used to taste like lemonade but had a kick like vodka, or worse."

Pisco Punch gained fame worldwide thanks to pieces written by travelers including Mark Twain and Harold Ross (founder of New Yorker magazine). In Rudyard Kipling's 1899 epic From Sea to Sea, he immortalized pisco punch as being "compounded of the shavings of cherub's wings, the glory of a tropical dawn, the red clouds of sunset and the fragments of lost epics by dead masters." Unfortunately, prohibition closed the doors of the Bank Exchange, and Duncan Nicol died soon thereafter—supposedly taking the exact recipe to his grave. Variations of the drink are still prepared in San Francisco.

See also 
Drink topics
 List of cocktails with less common spirits
 Pisco
 Pisco Sour
 Punch (drink)
Regional topics
 Peruvian cuisine and drinks

References

Sources
 
 
 
 
 
 
 
 Pauline Jacobson - A Fire-Defying Landmark, The Bulletin, San Francisco, 4 May 1912, Pg. 13

External links 
 : Summary of radio interview: KGO-ABC 810AM "Dining Around with Gene Burns", the most popular foodie radio program of San Francisco, telling us about Peruvian gastronomy and the historical relation of Peruvian Pisco brandy with the City by the Bay.

Pisco
Western United States
California culture
Cocktails with brandy
Food and drink in the San Francisco Bay Area
Cuisine of the Western United States
Mixed drinks